God the Mother may refer to:
 Mother goddess
 Zahng Gil-jah

See also
 Divine Mother (disambiguation)
 Mother of God (disambiguation)